The California Society of Professional Engineers (CSPE) is the California affiliate of National Society of Professional Engineers. It is organized into local chapters.

External links 
 

Engineering societies based in the United States
Clubs and societies in California
 
Science and technology in California